The 1922 Michigan Mines football team represented the Michigan College of Mines—now known as Michigan Technological University—as an independent during the 1922 college football season. Michigan Mines compiled a 1–0–1 record.

Schedule

References

Michigan Mines
Michigan Tech Huskies football seasons
College football undefeated seasons
Michigan Mines football